Andri Fannar Baldursson (born 10 January 2002) is an Icelandic professional footballer who plays as a midfielder for Eredivisie club NEC, on loan from the Serie A club Bologna.

Club career
Andri started his career with local club Breiðablik in Kópavogur before going on loan to Bologna in January 2019. He impressed and was bought by Bologna in August 2019. Andri made his debut in Serie A on 22 February 2020, coming on as a 59th-minute substitute for Andreas Skov Olsen in a 1–1 draw against Udinese, becoming the fifth Icelander to ever play in Serie A. In 2020 Andri was the youngest Icelandic player to play in the top five leagues in Europe.

On 23 August 2021, Danish Superliga club Copenhagen confirmed that Baldursson had joined the club on a season-long loan deal with an option to buy. After a season of limited playing time due to injuries - only eight appearances - Baldursson returned to Bologna at the end of the season.

On 6 July 2022, Andri joined NEC in the Netherlands on a season-long loan with an option to buy.

International career
Andri has featured for the U16, U17, U18, U19 and U21 Icelandic youth national teams.

He made his Iceland senior national team debut on 8 September 2020 in a Nations League game against Belgium. He started the game and was substituted after 54 minutes in a 5–1 away loss.

Career statistics

Club

Honours
Copenhagen
 Danish Superliga: 2021–22
 The Atlantic Cup: runner-up 2022

References

External links
 
 

2002 births
Living people
Andri Baldursson
Andri Baldursson
Andri Baldursson
Andri Baldursson
Association football midfielders
Bologna F.C. 1909 players
F.C. Copenhagen players
NEC Nijmegen players
Serie A players
Danish Superliga players
Andri Baldursson
Andri Baldursson
Andri Baldursson
Expatriate footballers in Italy
Expatriate men's footballers in Denmark
Expatriate footballers in the Netherlands